Andy Cornick (born 9 June 1981) is a Welsh field hockey player.

He represented Wales in the 2014 Commonwealth Games in Glasgow.

He has played club hockey in the Men's England Hockey League for Oxted and Hampstead & Westminster.

References

1981 births
Living people
Welsh male field hockey players
Field hockey players at the 2014 Commonwealth Games
Commonwealth Games competitors for Wales
Hampstead & Westminster Hockey Club players
Men's England Hockey League players